The 1971 Tower Hamlets Council election took place on 13 May 1971 to elect members of Tower Hamlets London Borough Council in London, England. The entire council was up for election and the Labour party stayed in overall control of the council.

Background

Election result

Ward results

References

1971
1971 London Borough council elections
20th century in the London Borough of Tower Hamlets